Michael Sydney Doohan  (born 4 June 1965) is an Australian former Grand Prix motorcycle road racing World Champion, who won five consecutive 500 cc World Championships.

Biography
Originally from the Gold Coast, Queensland, Doohan attended St Joseph's College, Gregory Terrace and Aspley State High School, Brisbane. In a break-out season he also won the final Australian motorcycle Grand Prix to be held in the TT format at Mount Panorama before the race became a round of the World Championship the following year and moved to Phillip Island. He is one of the few 500 cc or MotoGP World Champions to have won a Superbike World Championship race.

He made his Grand Prix debut for Honda on an NSR 500 cc two-stroke motorcycle in 1989. Late in the 1990 season Doohan claimed his first victory at the Hungarian Grand Prix on his way to third in the championship. In 1991, he was paired with his fellow Australian Wayne Gardner on a Honda RVF750 superbike and won the Suzuka 8 Hours endurance race. He competed successfully throughout the early 1990s and appeared to be on his way to winning his first world championship when he was seriously injured in a practice crash before the 1992 Dutch TT. He suffered permanent and serious damage to his right leg due to medical complications and, at one stage, faced amputation of the leg. At the time, Doohan was 65 points in the lead of the championship, but could not compete for eight weeks after the crash. After an arduous recovery, he returned to racing for the final two races but could not prevent Yamaha rider Wayne Rainey from winning his third consecutive title (by four points from Doohan). In 1993 he struggled with the healing of his leg and the ability to race the Honda at elite level, stating later that in that year it was all he could do to just keep his ride at Honda. It was also during this time he switched to a left thumb-operated rear brake, as his right foot is no longer able to perform this function.

In 1994 however, he won his first 500 cc World Championship. Thereafter, until 1998, he dominated the class, winning five consecutive 500 cc World Championships. In 1997, his most successful year, Doohan won 12 out of 15 races, finished second in another two, and crashed out of the final race of the season at his home GP while leading by more than six seconds. In June 1996, Doohan was inducted as a Member of the Order of Australia for his contribution to the sport of motor racing.

Despite up to eight rivals on non-factory HRC Honda motorcycles Doohan's margin of superiority over them was such that in many races Doohan would build a comfortable lead and then ride well within his limits to cruise to victory. Although pure riding skill clearly played a large part in his success, the ability of his chief race engineer, Jeremy Burgess, to perfect the suspension and geometry of a racing motorcycle may have given him an advantage over his rivals. Between 1994 and 1998 the bike was said not to have had many changes, with Honda engineers reportedly becoming frustrated at Doohan's reluctance to try innovations such as electronic shifting (it was only when Rossi came to Honda in 2000 that Honda engineers had their head with Rossi willing to try more innovations).

One notable trait of Doohan's post-crash riding style was the use of a thumb-operated rear brake developed during 1993 owing to the reduced range of motion in his ankle. This was operated by a "nudge" bar similar to a personal water craft throttle, but mounted on the left handlebar. In 1999 Doohan had another accident, this time in a very wet qualifying session for the Spanish Grand Prix. He again broke his leg in several places and subsequently announced his retirement. Jeremy Burgess, Doohan's chief engineer for his entire career, later became Valentino Rossi's chief engineer. After Doohan retired he went to work as a roving adviser to Honda's Grand Prix race effort. At the conclusion of the 2004 season, Doohan and Honda parted company.

In June 2011, Doohan made an appearance at the Isle of Man TT. Doohan completed a parade lap, and was most enamored by the thrill and spectacle of the Snaefell Mountain Course. He then went on to pay tribute to his former Honda racing teammate, Joey Dunlop.

Court case
On 8 August 2006, Doohan appeared in Darwin Magistrates Court to face charges over a weekend fracas at a strip club. He was fined $2,500 after pleading guilty to assaulting a bouncer and failing to leave a licensed premise. No conviction was recorded.

Marriage
Doohan married Selina Sines, who had been his partner for the previous eleven years, on Tuesday 21 March 2006, on Hamilton Island; the couple have two children, including racing driver Jack Doohan.

Formula One
After his success in Grand Prix motorcycle racing he got a chance to test a Formula One race car, the Williams FW19, at Circuit de Catalunya (in Spain) in April 1998. He found the car difficult to drive and crashed against a guard rail.

Targa Tasmania Tarmac Rally 

In 2001, Doohan drove a Mercedes Benz CLK55 AMG works rally car with his co-driver Mark Stacey in the 2001 Targa Tasmania rally. He was in thirteenth place on day three when he crashed the car; he and Stacey were uninjured after the incident.

Doohan's Motocoaster
Doohan helped design an Intamin Motorbike Launch Roller Coaster, named Mick Doohan's Motocoaster. The ride is located at Dreamworld on the Gold Coast, Queensland.

Doohan's name was removed from the ride's branding in May 2022, and it is now known simply as Motocoaster.

Honours
Doohan was made a Member of the Order of Australia in 1996 and received an Australian Sports Medal in 2000. He was awarded the "Key to the City" by the City of Gold Coast in 1997. He was inducted into the Sport Australia Hall of Fame in 2009. The first turn at Phillip Island Grand Prix Circuit is named after him.

In 2009 as part of the Q150 celebrations, Doohan was announced as one of the Q150 Icons of Queensland for his role as a "sports legend".

Career statistics

Superbike World Championship

Races by year
(key) (Races in bold indicate pole position, races in italics indicate fastest lap)

Grand Prix motorcycle racing

By season

By class

Races by year
(key) (Races in bold indicate pole position, races in italics indicate fastest lap)

See also 

 Daijiro Kato
 Nicky Hayden
 Motorcycle sport

References

External links

 
 The Age article on Doohan

1965 births
Living people
Australian motorcycle racers
Motorcycle racers from Brisbane
500cc World Championship riders
Superbike World Championship riders
Australian people of Irish descent
Members of the Order of Australia
Recipients of the Australian Sports Medal
Sport Australia Hall of Fame inductees
Racing drivers from Brisbane
Mercedes-AMG Motorsport drivers
500cc World Riders' Champions